J43 may refer to:
 Elongated pentagonal gyrobirotunda
 Malaysia Federal Route J43
 Oukaïmeden Observatory, in Morocco